Råsunda IP was a football stadium in Solna, Sweden  and the former home stadium for the football team AIK before the construction of Råsunda Stadium. It was founded in 1910 and was demolished in 1937 when Råsunda Stadium was built on the existing site of the stadium

References 

1910 establishments in Sweden
Venues of the 1912 Summer Olympics
Olympic football venues
Olympic shooting venues
Defunct football venues in Sweden
Football venues in Stockholm
Sports venues completed in 1910
Sports venues demolished in 1937
1937 disestablishments in Sweden